are a style of footwear with a divided toe, originating in Japan. They are similar to  socks in both appearance and construction.

History

Japanese  are usually understood today to be a kind of split-toed sock that is not meant to be worn alone outdoors, much like regular socks.  However,  were originally a kind of leather shoe made from a single animal hide, as evidenced by historical usage and the earlier form of the word, spelled , with the kanji literally signifying "single hide".  As Japanese footwear evolved,  also changed, with the split-toe design emerging towards the late Heian period to allow the wearer to accommodate the thong of  straw sandals to reinforce the sole.  Outdoor versions of  involved some kind of reinforcement, as seen in the historical photographs above, with soles traditionally made of cloth, leather, or straw.

Brothers Tokujirō Ishibashi and Shōjirō Ishibashi, founders of the tyre company Bridgestone, are credited with the invention of rubber-soled  in 1922.

During the 1942 Battle of Milne Bay in Papua (now part of Papua New Guinea), the Allies of World War II faced the Japanese  (Special Naval Landing Forces), who wore  as part of their uniform. The distinctive tread marks left by the boots allowed Allied troops (mostly Australian troops with some American units) to follow the tracks, and thus Japanese soldiers, through the muddy forests. Examples of the boots worn by Japanese soldiers are held by the Australian War Memorial.

Use

 are known as footwear commonly used by construction workers, farmers, gardeners, rickshaw-pullers and other labourers, due to the tough material and heavy-duty but flexible rubber soles they are made from.

Though they have faced competition by the introduction of steel-toe workboots in some industries,  are still preferred by some due to the flexibility of the soles allowing the wearer a greater degree of grip than rigid-soled shoes allow. Other varieties of  have been developed for specific labouring purposes, such as knee-high  made entirely of rubber used by workers in rice fields and other wet and muddy environments.

These have some precedents in traditional kōgake ( with chainmail or plate armour).

Though typically worn for manual labour and exercise,  are also worn for comfort and as a casual shoe.

In popular culture

In recent years,  have been seen in Hollywood movie productions. Examples include The Wolverine, 47 Ronin, Big Hero 6, Star Trek, Thor: The Dark World and Black Panther.  have also been seen in the short movie Anima from Thom Yorke (2019).

See also
Tabi
Waraji

References

External links

Boots
Japanese footwear
Japanese inventions